Vejendla is a village in Guntur district of the Indian state of Andhra Pradesh. It is supposed to be the headquarters of Chebrolu mandal in Tenali revenue division. It is located in Chebrolu mandal of Tenali revenue division.

Geography 
Vejendla is situated to the north of the mandal headquarters, Chebrolu,

Governance 

Vejendla gram panchayat is the local self-government of the village. It is divided into wards and each ward is represented by a ward member. The village forms a part of Andhra Pradesh Capital Region and is under the jurisdiction of APCRDA.

Transport 
Tenali–Narakodur road bypasses Vejendla. Rural roads connects the village with Chebrole, Guntur bypass and Suddapalli. On this route, APSRTC operates buses from Guntur and Tenali bus stations. Vejendla railway station provides rail connectivity and is situated on Guntur–Tenali section of Guntur railway division.

Education 

As per the school information report for the academic year 2018–19, the village has a total of 10 schools. These schools include 6 Zilla/Mandal Parishad and 4 private schools.

See also 
List of villages in Guntur district

References 

Villages in Guntur district